Pasti Kembali is the sixth studio album from Malaysian singer Francissca Peter released in 1989.

Awards and recognitions
 The album released by Warner Music Malaysia achieves Platinum status.

Track listing

References

External links 
 Official Website

1989 albums
Francissca Peter albums
Warner Music Group albums
Malay-language albums